Elections were held in the state of Western Australia on 12 April 1930 to elect all 50 members to the Legislative Assembly. The incumbent Labor Party government, led by Premier Philip Collier, was defeated by the Nationalist-Country opposition, led by Opposition Leader James Mitchell.

Results 

|}

 230,076 electors were enrolled to vote at the election, but 11 of the 50 seats were uncontested, with 43,344 electors enrolled in those seats.

See also
 Members of the Western Australian Legislative Assembly, 1927–1930
 Members of the Western Australian Legislative Assembly, 1930–1933
 First Collier Ministry
 Second Mitchell Ministry

References

Elections in Western Australia
1930 elections in Australia
1930s in Western Australia
April 1930 events